Prince Ottaviano de' Medici di Toscana di Ottajano (b. 1957) is an Italian noble and member of the Ottajano branch of the House of Medici. He is the president of the Associazione Internationale Medicae (International Medici Association) and one of the founders of Save Florence, an initiative to conserve the cultural heritage of the city of Florence.

Family origins 

Ottaviano's branch of the House of Medici is descended from Ottaviano de' Medici (Gonfaloniere di Giustizia) and his wife Francesca Salviati, parents of Pope Leo XI.

Marriage and issue 

 Cosimo Maria de' Medici - born in 1991
 Guglielmo de' Medici - born in 1992

Published works 
 Ottaviano de' Medici di Toscana di Ottajano, Storia della mia dinastia, Polistampa 2001.

See also 

 Princes of Ottajano
 Ottaviano de' Medici
 Genealogical tables of the House of Medici
 History of Florence

References 

1957 births
House of Medici
Living people